Francis "Fanny" Freeman (also known as Ajax) is a fictional supervillain first appeared in Deadpool  #14 (cover-dated March 1998) and was created by writer Joe Kelly and artist Walter A. McDaniel.

Fictional character biography
The man known as "The Attending" was the former enforcer at Dr. Killebrew's laboratory, known as the Workshop, part of the Hospice for failed supersoldiers at the Weapon X Project. Francis acted as the strongarm for Killebrew, reining in the project's "washouts" that were fodder for Killebrew's sadistic experiments whenever they stepped out of line. This included Wade Wilson, who would later be known as the mercenary Deadpool.

Having had his nerves removed by Killebrew for better pain management, Francis would later have enhanced strength and intuitive capability, as well as receiving subcutaneous implants for super-speed and agility.

After endless taunting from Wilson, Francis was given permission by Killebrew to kill him. Francis orchestrated events so that Wilson would perform a mercy killing on another inmate, which was against the rules; the inmate Deadpool was to kill was one to whom he had grown particularly close. After Francis removed Wilson's heart, his healing factor manifested itself for the first time by regenerating a new heart for the mercenary. However, the entire series of events cost him his sanity. Taking the codename Deadpool, he hunted down and seemingly killed Francis.

Revealed to have survived, Francis resurfaced years later using the codename of Ajax. He hunted down and killed many of the surviving members of the Weapon X project to exact his revenge on Deadpool. Ajax tortured Killebrew at his mountain home in the Alps in order to obtain Wade's teleporter frequency; after which he teleported Wade next to a nearby cliff and sucker-punched him, sending Deadpool to his apparent death.

In a near death experience, however, it was revealed that because Wade came back from the dead once to kill Francis, he was now bound by honor and destiny to finish the job he began those many years ago, urged on by the ghosts of Francis' victims who had also been Wilson's friends. The battle continued as Deadpool rescued Killebrew and sought shelter at Killebrew's neighbor's house. This was owned by Ilaney Bruckner who was reluctantly dragged into the conflict when Deadpool destroyed the house to slow down Francis.

Francis caught up with the trio and proceeded to punch Deadpool repeatedly at super-speed. Before he could kill Deadpool, however, Killebrew doused him with gasoline and lit up a flare, destroying Francis' head and neck protection. For doing this, Killebrew was shredded at super speed.

Once again catching up with the fleeing Deadpool, Ajax fell victim to a trap laid by his intended victim which resulted in his armor's circuitry being exposed. Taking advantage of this, Deadpool arranged for Ajax to plunge both of them into a lake, short-circuiting his armor and giving Deadpool the opportunity to kill him, which he did by snapping his neck. Ajax "re-appeared" years later in one of Deadpool's nightmares, more specifically on a television set.

Blackheart releases Ajax from Hell in an attempt to prevent Deadpool and Thanos from meddling in his latest plot to overthrow Mephisto. Ajax, now calling himself Abyss Man, locates and attempts to kill the pair, but the duo subdue him and turn him into a gateway to Hell with the help of Black Talon.

Powers and abilities
Francis has enhanced strength and intuitive capacity, as a result of genetic modifications by Doctor Killebrew. After receiving implants, he gained superhuman speed and agility. His nerves were also removed to dramatically increase his tolerance for pain.

In other media
Francis Freeman / Ajax appears in the live-action film Deadpool (2016), portrayed by Ed Skrein. According to co-writer Rhett Reese, the character was selected to serve as the film's antagonist due to his "sadistic quality and his imperviousness to pain and what that implied about him" which "lands very hard on Wade Wilson and creates the fun antagonism". This version of Ajax works as a scientist at an underground facility called the Workshop and tortures Wade Wilson to activate his mutant genes and sell him as a super slave. However, Wade escapes and seeks revenge after the torture leaves him disfigured. After Wade corners and injures him, Freeman escapes when Colossus and Negasonic Teenage Warhead distract his attacker. He and his partner Angel Dust later retaliate by kidnapping Wade's girlfriend Vanessa Carlysle. Wade, Colossus, and Negasonic confront Freeman, Angel Dust, and their team in a scrapyard, where Wade kills Freeman.

References

External links
 

Characters created by Joe Kelly
Comics characters introduced in 1998
Deadpool characters
Fictional mercenaries in comics
Marvel Comics film characters
Marvel Comics mutates
Marvel Comics scientists
Marvel Comics supervillains
Fictional characters with disfigurements
Fictional swordfighters in comics
Marvel Comics characters with accelerated healing
Marvel Comics characters with superhuman strength
Fictional British people
X-Men supporting characters